The governor of Goa is a nominal head and representative of the president of India in the state of Goa. The governor is appointed by the president for a term of five years. P. S. Sreedharan Pillai became governor on 7 July 2021.

Powers and functions

The governor has:

Executive powers related to administration, appointments and removals,
Legislative powers related to lawmaking and the state legislature, that is Vidhan Sabha or Vidhan Parishad, and
Discretionary powers to be carried out according to the discretion of the governor.

Ex officio powers
The governor is the chancellor of Goa University and exercises powers delegated under the Goa University Act, 1984, and the statutes of the university.
The governor is the ex officio president of the Indian Red Cross Society, Goa Branch, and has the powers to appoint the chairman, hon. secretary, etc.
The governor is the president of the Goa State Environment Protection Council, which is an advisory body, set up by the government of Goa. The council consisting of government authorities and the NGOs engaged in environmental and the related areas meets once in six months and deliberates on various issues on the environment and ecology of the state.
The governor is the chairman of the Special Fund for Rehabilitation and Reconstruction of Ex-Servicemen and Widows.

Previous governors of Goa

Portuguese governors general

The first Portuguese governor general was Francisco de Almeida in 1505 and the last Manuel Antonio Vassalo e Silva who left office in 1961. In total there have been 163 governors general.

Lieutenant governors of Goa, Daman and Diu
Goa, along with Daman and Diu was a Union Territory of India until 30 May 1987. As such it had a lieutenant governor till that time.

Governors after 1987
Goa became a full-fledged state of India in 1987 and since then has had the following governors:

See also
 History of Goa
 Governors of India

References

 
Goa
governors